Generalissimo is the rank of 'supreme general' .

Generalissimo may also refer to:

 Generalissimo (30 Rock), the 30 Rock episode
 Generalissimo El Busho, Ted Rall cartoon parody
 A short-lived henchman of Dr Evil in the first Austin Powers film

See also
 Supreme Leader (disambiguation)
 Paramount leader
 Supreme Commander (disambiguation)
 Admiralissimo